|}

The Michael Seely Memorial Stakes, currently ran as the Oaks Farm Stables Fillies' Stakes is a Listed flat horse race in Great Britain open to fillies aged three years only.
It is run at York over a distance of 7 furlongs and 192 yards, and it is scheduled to take place each year in May.

The race was first run in 2005 over 7 furlongs (1,408 metres), and was open to older horses.  The current distance and age limit were introduced the following year.

The race commemorates Michael Seely, racing correspondent of The Times, who died in 1993.

Winners

See also
 Horse racing in Great Britain
 List of British flat horse races

References

Racing Post:

Flat races in Great Britain
York Racecourse
Mile category horse races for fillies and mares
Recurring sporting events established in 2005
2005 establishments in England